Fargo Bridge & Iron Co. was a bridge company based in North Dakota in the early part of the 20th century.

History
It grew out of a partnership beginning in 1889 between Francis E. Dibley (1860-1910), who had previously been a representative of the Wisconsin Bridge and Iron Company, and  W. H. Robinson  from Mayville. In 1898, Dibley and W.H. Robinson formed the bridge-building partnership of Dibley and Robinson, and actively began soliciting county bridge contracts throughout eastern North Dakota. In 1901, Robinson left the company, and Dibley reorganized the firm into the Fargo Bridge and Iron Company. 

It was the state's dominant bridge-building company in its day, and its works include many bridges that are now listed on the U.S. National Register of Historic Places.

Works (attribution) include
Beaver Creek Bridge, built 1913, across Beaver Creek, unnamed co. rd., approximately 13 mi. E and 4 mi. N of Finley, ND (Fargo Bridge & Iron Co.), NRHP-listed
Crystal Bridge, Appleton Ave., over Cart Cr., Crystal, ND (Fargo Bridge & Iron Co.), NRHP-listed
Elliott Bridge, Across the Souris River, unnamed co. rd., approximately 4 mi. N of Towner, Towner, ND (Fargo Bridge & Iron Co.), NRHP-listed
Grace City Bridge, Across the James River, unnamed co. rd., 1 mi. SW of Grace City, ND (Fargo Bridge & Iron Co.), NRHP-listed
Nesheim Bridge, Across the Sheyenne River, unnamed co. rd., approximately 2 mi. SW of McVille, ND (Fargo Bridge & Iron Co.), NRHP-listed
New Rockford Bridge, Across the James River, unnamed co. rd., jct. with ND 15, New Rockford, ND (Fargo Bridge & Iron Co.), NRHP-listed
Northwood Bridge, Across the Goose River, unnamed co. rd., 1.5 mi. SW of Northwood, ND (Fargo Bridge & Iron Co.), NRHP-listed
Porter Elliott Bridge, Across the Sheyenne River, unnamed co. rd., approximately 5 mi. E and 1 mi. N of Hillsboro, ND (Fargo Bridge & Iron Co.), NRHP-listed
West Antelope Bridge, Across the Sheyenne River, unnamed co. rd., approximately 30 mi. SE of jct. of ND 30 and US 2, Flora, ND (Fargo Bridge & Iron Co.), NRHP-listed
Westgaard Bridge, Across the Sheyenne River, unnamed co. rd., approximately 6 mi. N and 1 mi. E of Voltaire, ND (Fargo Bridge & Iron Co.), NRHP-listed

References

Bridge companies
Construction and civil engineering companies of the United States
1898 establishments in North Dakota
Construction and civil engineering companies established in 1898
American companies established in 1898
Companies based in North Dakota